Mirafra is a genus of lark in the family Alaudidae. Some Mirafra species are called "larks", while others are called "bush larks". They are found from Africa through South Asia to Australia.

Taxonomy and systematics
The phylogeny of larks (Alaudidae) was reviewed by Alström et al. (2013) who found that the following species form a well supported monophyletic group, which is the sister lineage to Heteromirafra.

Extant species
The genus contains twenty-four species:

Former species
Some authorities, either presently or formerly, recognize several additional species as belonging to the genus Mirafra, including:
 Short-clawed lark (as Mirafra chuana)
 Dusky lark (as Mirafra nigricans)
 Rufous-rumped lark (as Mirafra erythropygia or Mirafra nigricans erythropygia)
 Indian desert finch-lark (as Mirafra phoenicuroides)
 Rufous-tailed lark (as Mirafra phoenicura)
 Madagascan lark (as Mirafra hova)
 Sabota lark (as Mirafra sabota)
 Bradfield's lark (as Mirafra naevia)
 Pink-breasted lark (as Mirafra poecilosterna)
 Foxy lark (as Mirafra alopex)
 Masai fawn-coloured lark (as Mirafra intercedens)
 Fawn-coloured lark (as Mirafra africanoides)
 Karoo lark (as Mirafra albescens or Mirafra nivosa)
 Red lark (as Mirafra burra)
 Dune lark (as Mirafra erythrochlamys)
 Barlow's lark (as Mirafra erythrochlamys barlowi)
 Rudd's lark (as Mirafra ruddi)
 Archer's lark (as Mirafra archeri)
 Sidamo lark (as Mirafra sidamoensis)
 Ngaundere sun lark (as Mirafra strümpelli)
 Uele sun lark (as Mirafra bucolica)

References

 
Alaudidae
Bird genera
Taxonomy articles created by Polbot